The Big Garlic River is a  river in Marquette County, Michigan. It empties into Lake Superior.

See also
List of rivers of Michigan

References

Rivers of Michigan
Rivers of Marquette County, Michigan
Tributaries of Lake Superior